The North Texas Fresh is a semi-professional basketball team based in Fort Worth, Texas. The Fresh are a member of the Universal Basketball Association.

History 
The franchise is owned by Jay Bowdy, who was a high school and college player from the Fort Worth area. After two seasons at Southwestern Christian College (2006 NJCAA All-American Honorable Mention) Bowdy transferred to the University of West Georgia, an NCAA Division II program.

The Fresh play their home games in Fort Worth, Texas, at Crowley Middle School. The team schedules games against both UBA and non-UBA (independent) opponents.

Established in 2009, the Fresh began play in the American Basketball Association 2009-10 season. After three seasons in the ABA the Fresh moved to the UBA in 2012.

Season-by-season

References

External links
Official website

Defunct American Basketball Association (2000–present) teams
Basketball in Fort Worth, Texas
Basketball teams in Texas
Basketball teams established in 2009
2009 establishments in Texas